Skewered goose liver is a dish from southern Tel Aviv.  It is seasoned with salt and black pepper and sometimes with spices like cumin, cinnamon, paprika, nutmeg, allspice and turmeric then grilled.

See also
Israeli cuisine
Offal

References

Israeli cuisine
Middle Eastern grilled meats
Grilled skewers
Offal